Jorge Luis de León (born August 15, 1987) is a Dominican former professional baseball relief pitcher. He previously played in Major League Baseball (MLB) for the Houston Astros.

Career

Houston Astros
Signed by scouts Julio Linares and Sergio Beltre, De León began his professional career as a shortstop in 2006, playing for the DSL Astros, hitting .230 in 56 games. Again with the DSL Astros in 2007, De León hit .190 in 52 games. He moved stateside in 2008, playing for the Greeneville Astros and hitting .235 in 32 games. In 2009, he played for the Tri-City ValleyCats and the Lexington Legends, hitting a combined .206 in 66 games. He converted to pitching for the 2010 season, making 23 appearances for the ValleyCats and going 2–1 with a 0.64 ERA.

De León was called up to the majors for the first time on August 8, 2013. On September 18, in the 12th inning, De León retired the opposing side Cincinnati Reds batters on 3 pitches. De León was the first American League player to achieve this in extra innings in over a century, since Hippo Vaughn accomplished the feat in 1910. He was outrighted off the roster on October 17, 2013.

Oakland Athletics
De León was claimed off waivers by the Oakland Athletics on October 9, 2014. The Athletics designated him for assignment on December 9.

Chicago Cubs
On January 10, 2015, De Leon signed a minor league deal with the Chicago Cubs.

Los Angeles Dodgers
The Cubs released him and he signed another minor league contract with the Los Angeles Dodgers, who assigned him to the AAA Oklahoma City Dodgers. He pitched in five games for Oklahoma City and 34 for the AA Tulsa Drillers and was 1–4 with a 4.74 ERA. He was released in August.

Gary SouthShore Railcats
On April 20, 2017, de Leon signed with the Gary SouthShore RailCats of the American Association of Independent Professional Baseball. He re-signed with the team on August 4, 2018.

Sugar Land Skeeters
On September 13, 2018, de Leon was traded to the Sugar Land Skeeters of the Atlantic League of Professional Baseball. He became a free agent following the 2018 season.

References

External links

1987 births
Living people
Corpus Christi Hooks players
Dominican Republic expatriate baseball players in the United States
Dominican Summer League Astros players
Gary SouthShore RailCats players
Greeneville Astros players
Houston Astros players
Lancaster JetHawks players

Leones del Escogido players
Lexington Legends players
Major League Baseball pitchers
Major League Baseball players from the Dominican Republic
New Orleans Zephyrs players
Oklahoma City Dodgers players
Oklahoma City RedHawks players
People from Azua Province
Sugar Land Skeeters players
Tri-City ValleyCats players
Tulsa Drillers players